Hinnerk is a German magazine for the LGBT community in Hamburg, Bremen and northern part of Germany. Hinnerk is a free magazine and distributes around 25,000 copies monthly.

History 
The magazine was founded in November 1993. Founder of Hinnerk were Werner Hinzpeter and Burkhard Knopke. CEO is Peter Goebel. Chief editor is today Stefan Mielchen. The head office of the magazine is in Hamburg.

Hinnerk works together with LGBT magazines EXIT (Ruhr and Münster), gab (Frankfurt, Mannheim, Heidelberg), Leo (Munich), rik (Cologne), and Siegessäule (Berlin).

External links 
 Website 
 Hinnerk (magazine) in the German National Library catalogue 
 

1993 establishments in Germany
German-language magazines
LGBT-related magazines published in Germany
Gay men's magazines
Magazines established in 1993
Magazines published in Hamburg
Monthly magazines published in Germany